The 1992 Auburn Tigers football team represented Auburn University in the 1992 NCAA Division I-A football season. The team played their home games at Jordan–Hare Stadium in Auburn, Alabama. They were represented in the Southeastern Conference in the West Division and coached by head coach Pat Dye in his 12th and final season.

Schedule

Roster

References

Auburn
Auburn Tigers football seasons
Auburn Tigers football